sometimes called Samurai X, is a Japanese anime television series, based on the manga series of the same title by Nobuhiro Watsuki. The series was produced by Studio Gallop (episodes 1–66), Studio Deen (episodes 67–95) and SPE Visual Works and directed by Kazuhiro Furuhashi. It was broadcast in Japan on Fuji TV from January 1996 to September 1998. Besides an animated feature film, three series of original video animations (OVAs) were also produced; the first adapts stories from the manga that were not featured in the anime series; the second is both a retelling and a sequel to the anime series; and the third was a reimagining of the second arc of the series.

The series was later licensed in North America and released on DVD by Media Blasters. The first two seasons aired in the United States on Cartoon Network, as part of the Toonami block, while the third season was only featured on DVD. The English-language versions of the OVAs, as well as the film, were originally released as Samurai X in North America, although the original name was included on the later DVD and Blu-ray Disc releases.

Rurouni Kenshin has ranked among the 100 most-watched series in Japan multiple times.

A second anime television series adaptation by Liden Films is set to premiere in 2023 on Fuji TV's Noitamina programming block.

Plot

When arriving in Tokyo in the 11th year of Meiji era (1878), the former Ishin Shishi Himura Kenshin wanders around Japan until reaching Tokyo. There, he is attacked by a young woman named Kamiya Kaoru, who believes him to be the Hitokiri Battōsai but ends up forgetting about him upon the appearance of a man claiming to be the "Hitokiri Battōsai" - tarnishing the name of the swordsmanship school that she teaches. Kenshin decides to help her and defeats the fake Battōsai, revealing himself as the actual former manslayer who has become a pacifist. Kaoru invites Kenshin to stay at her dojo, claiming she is not interested in his past. Although Kenshin accepts the invitation, his fame causes him to accidentally attract other warriors who wish him dead. However, Kenshin also meets new friends including the young Myōjin Yahiko who wishes to reach his strength but ends up becoming Kaoru's student, the fighter-for-hire Sagara Sanosuke from the Sekihō Army who realizes the current Kenshin is different from the Ishin Shishi he detested for killing his leader Sagara Sōzō, and the doctor Takani Megumi who wishes to atone for her sins as a drug dealer, inspired by Kenshin's devotion to his past.

Production

In a manga volume prior to the release of the anime, Watsuki said that while some fans might object to the adaptation of the series into anime, Watsuki looked forward to the adaptation and felt it would work since the manga was already "anime-esque." He had some worries about the series since he felt since the creation of the series was sudden and the series had a "tight" production schedule. In another note in the same volume Watsuki added that he had little input in the series, as he was too busy with the publishing. In addition his schedule did not match the schedule of the anime production staff. Watsuki said that it would be impossible to make the anime and manga exactly the same, so he would feel fine with the anime adaptation as long as it took advantage of the strengths of an anime format.

After the anime began production, Watsuki said that the final product was "better than imagined" and that it was created with the "pride and soul of professionals." Watsuki criticized the timing, the "off-the-wall, embarrassing subtitles," and the condensing of the stories; for instance, he felt the Jin-e storyline would not sufficiently fit two episodes. Watsuki said that he consulted a director and that he felt the anime would improve after that point. The fact that the CD book voice actors, especially Megumi Ogata and Tomokazu Seki, who portrayed Kenshin and Sanosuke in the CD books, respectively, did not get their corresponding roles in the anime disappointed Watsuki. Watsuki reported receiving some letters of protest against the voice actor change and letters requesting that Ogata portray Seta Sōjirō; Watsuki said that he wanted Ogata to play Misao and that Ogata would likely find "stubborn girl" roles more challenging than the "pretty boy" roles she usually gets, though Watsuki felt Ogata would have "no problem" portraying a "stubborn girl." Watsuki said that the new voice actor arrangement "works out" and that he hoped that the CD book voice actors would find roles in the anime. Watsuki said that the reason why the CD book voice actors did not get the corresponding roles in the anime was due to the fact that many more companies were involved in the production of the anime than the production of the CD books, and therefore the "industry power-structure" affected the series.

The second season of the anime television series had some original stories, not in the manga. Watsuki said that some people disliked "TV originals," but to him, the concept was "exciting." Watsuki said that because the first half of the original storyline that existed by the time of the production of Volume 10 in Japan was "jammed" into the first season, he looked forward to a "more entertaining" second season. Watsuki added that it was obvious that the staff of the first season "put their hearts and souls" into the work, but that the second series will be "a much better stage for their talents."

Mayo Suzukaze voiced Kenshin. She said that she started feeling like Kenshin after years of work as his voice, but says that providing the voice for his character was one of her best experiences.

In producing the English dub version of the series, Media Blasters considered following suit, with Mona Marshall considered a finalist to voice Kenshin. Richard Hayworth was eventually selected for the role, giving Kenshin's character a more masculine voice in the English adaptation. Marshall was also selected to voice the younger Kenshin during flashback scenes. Clark Cheng, Media Blasters dub script writer, said that localizing Kenshin's unusual speech was a difficult process. His use of de gozaru and oro were not only character trademarks that indicated his state of mind, but important elements to the story. However, neither is directly translatable into English, and in the end the company chose to replace de gozaru with "that I did," "that I am," or "that I do." Kenshin's signature oro was replaced with "huah" to simulate a "funny sound" that had no real meaning. Lex Lang is  Sanosuke's voice actor. When writing Sanosuke's dialogue, Clark Cheng, the writer of the English dub script, noted that the character was smarter than he would have liked in the first few episodes, so Cheng tried slowly to change the character's dialogue to make Sanosuke seem less intelligent so he would be more similar to the equivalent in the Japanese version of the series.

Release

Rurouni Kenshin, directed by Kazuhiro Furuhashi, began airing on Japan's Fuji TV on January 10, 1996, and ended on September 8, 1998. It was produced by SPE Visual Works and Fuji TV, and was animated from episode 1 to 66 by Studio Gallop, whereas the episodes from 67 onwards were animated by Studio Deen. The anime only adapts the manga up until the fight with Shishio, from then on it features original material not in the manga. The final episode did not air in Japan, but was a bonus episode for the VHS and DVD releases. Since its premiere in Japan, episodes from the series have been collected in DVDs various times: two DVDs series with both of them featuring four episodes per volume and three DVD boxes. 26 collected DVD volumes were released in Japan.

Sony Pictures Television International (then under the name Columbia Pictures Television later moved to Columbia TriStar Television) created their own English dub of the series, under the name , which aired outside North America. In 1999, Sony had tried and failed to market the series in the United States via an existing company. The TV series was again licensed for North America by Media Blasters, who split it up into "seasons", and released on DVD. It began airing in the US on Cartoon Network as a part of the Toonami Block on March 17, 2003, but ended at the completion of the "second season" (episode 62). Some of the show's depictions of obscene language, intense violence, and tobacco and drug usage were subject to heavy editing on Toonami. Episodes 63–95 did not air, but were included in the DVD release. The "seasons" were released in three premium "Bento box" DVD boxes on November 18, 2003, March 30, 2004, and July 27, 2004. They were re-released as "economy box" sets on November 15, 2005, January 17, 2006, and February 14, 2006. All three seasons, with both the original Japanese audio and the Media Blasters dub (Bang Zoom! Entertainment), were streamed on Netflix.

Related media

Anime film

An anime film, Rurouni Kenshin: The Motion Picture, premiered in Japan on December 20, 1997.

Original video animations

A 4-episode original video animation (OVA), titled Rurouni Kenshin: Trust & Betrayal, which served as a prequel to the anime television series, was released in Japan in 1999.

A 2-episode OVA, titled Rurouni Kenshin: Reflection, which served as a sequel to the anime television series, was released in Japan from 2001 to 2002.

A 2-episode OVA, Rurouni Kenshin: New Kyoto Arc, which remade the series' Kyoto arc, was released in Japan from 2011 to 2012.

Soundtracks

All of the TV series music was composed by Noriyuki Asakura and several CDs have been released by Sony Records. The first, Rurouni Kenshin OST 1 was released on April 1, 1996, and contained twenty-three songs that were used during the first episodes of the series. The second one, Rurouni Kenshin OST 2 - Departure was released on October 21, 1996, and contained fifteen tracks that were first used before the start of the Kyoto Arc. The next one, Rurouni Kenshin OST 3 - Journey to Kyoto was released on April 21, 1997, and contained the thirteen tracks that originally used in the Kyoto Arc. For the next arc, Rurouni Kenshin OST 4 - Let it Burn was released on February 1, 1998, and contained twelve tracks.

For the OVAs, all themes were composed by Taku Iwasaki and the CDs were released by SPE Visual Works (later SME Visual Works). The first, Rurouni Kenshin Tsuioku-hen OST was released on March 20, 1999, and contained sixteen tracks that were used in Samurai X: Trust & Betrayal. For the Reflection OVA, a soundtrack called Rurouni Kenshin Seisō-hen OST was released on January 23, 2002, and contained eighteen tracks.

Several compilations of the anime songs were also released in collection CDs. Thirty tracks were selected and joined in a CD called Rurouni Kenshin - The Director's Collection, that was released on July 21, 1997. Rurouni Kenshin Best Theme Collection was released on March 21, 1998, and contained ten tracks. All of the opening and ending themes were also collected in a CD called Rurouni Kenshin OP/ED Theme Collection. The Japanese voice actors of the series also composed songs that were released as two Cds Rurouni Kenshin Songs Album. All of the anime tracks, including OVAs and films tracks were collected in Rurouni Kenshin Complete CD-Box that was released on September 19, 2002. It contains the four TV OSTs, the two OVA OSTs, the movie OST, the two game OSTs, an opening & closing theme collection, and the two Character Songs albums. On July 27, 2011, Rurouni Kenshin Complete Collection, which includes all the opening and ending themes and the theme song of the animated film, was released.

Several drama CDs, which adapted stories in the Rurouni Kenshin manga, were also released in Japan. Each of them featured different voice actors from that one that worked in the anime adaptation. In Volume 5 of the manga Watsuki stated that he anticipated that the script of the third volume, which has the stories involving the character Udō Jin-e, would be "pretty close" but would have additional lines belonging to Sanosuke and Yahiko.

Reception
When TV Asahi, a television network in Japan, conducted a nationwide survey for the one hundred most popular animated television series, the Rurouni Kenshin anime came in sixty-sixth place. They also conducted an online web poll, in which Rurouni Kenshin was placed at number 62. Nearly a year later, TV Asahi once again conducted an online poll for the top one hundred anime, and Rurouni Kenshin anime advanced in rank and came in twenty-sixth place. It also ranked at tenth place in the Web's Most Wanted 2005, ranking in the animation category. The fourth DVD of the anime was also Anime Castle's best selling DVD in October 2001. Rurouni Kenshin was also a finalist in the American Anime Awards in the category "Long Series" but lost against Fullmetal Alchemist. In 2010, Mania.com's Briana Lawrence listed Rurouni Kenshin at number three of the website's "10 Anime Series That Need a Reboot".

The anime has also been commented on by Chris Shepard from ANN noting a well-crafted plot and good action scenes. However, he also criticized that during the first episodes the fights never get quite interesting as it becomes a bit predictable that Kenshin is going to win as the music of moments of victory is repeated many times. Lynzee Loveridge from Anime News Network highlighted as the most known series to use the Meiji period and saw the Kyoto Arc as one of the best ones.

However, Mark A. Grey from the same site mentioned that all those negatives points disappear during the Kyoto Arc due to amazing fights and a great soundtrack. Tasha Robinson from SciFi.com remarked "Kenshin's schizoid personal conflict between his ruthless-killer side and his country-bumpkin" side was a perfect way to develop good stories which was one of the factors that made the series popular. Anime News Network acclaimed both Shishio's characterization in regards to what he represents to Kenshin's past: "a merciless killer who believes his sword to be the only justice in the land." Similarly, Chris Beveridge Mania Entertainment praised the build up the anime's Kyoto arc has had as after fighting so much build up, Shishio fights and delivers skills that would amaze viewers despite suffering major wounds in the process. Beveridge reflected that while Shishio's death caused by his old wounds rather than an attack by Kenshin, the series' protagonist was also pushed down to his limits in the story arc due to fighting Sojiro and Shinomori before Shishio. Nevertheless, the writer concluded that it was still way paid off despite assumptions that Shishio's death might initially come across as a copout.

Although Them Anime's Carlos Ross also liked the action scenes and storyline, he added that the number of childish and violent scenes make the show a bit unbalanced, saying it is not recommended for younger children. Surat approved of the anime series, stating that while half of the first-season episodes consisted of filler, the situation "clicks" upon the introduction of Saitō Hajime and that he disagreed with people who disliked the television series compared to the OVAs. Surat said that while the Media Blasters anime dub is "well-cast," the English dub does not sound natural since the producers were too preoccupied with making the voice performances mimic the Japanese performances. Surat said that while he "didn't mind" the first filler arc with the Christianity sect, he could not stomach the final two filler arcs, and Japanese audiences disapproved of the final two filler arcs. Robin Brenner from Library Journal noted that despite its pacifist messages, Rurouni Kenshin was too violent, recommending it to older audiences.

In the making of the samurai anime Dororo, Kazuhiro Furuhashi was selected as its director mainly because of his experience with Rurouni Kenshin.

Notes

References

External links
 

Rurouni Kenshin
1996 anime television series debuts
ADV Films
Adventure anime and manga
Anime series based on manga
Aniplex
Fiction set in 1878
Fuji TV original programming
Gallop (studio)
Historical anime and manga
Liden Films
Madman Entertainment anime
Martial arts anime and manga
Meiji period in fiction
Romance anime and manga
Samurai in anime and manga
Studio Deen
Television series by Sony Pictures Television
Toonami
Works about atonement